Doba is a town in south-western Ivory Coast. It is a sub-prefecture of San-Pédro Department in San-Pédro Region, Bas-Sassandra District.

A large northwest portion of the sub-prefecture lies within Taï National Park.

Doba was a commune until March 2012, when it became one of 1126 communes nationwide that were abolished.
In 2021, the population of the sub-prefecture of Doba was 95,246.

Villages
The thirteen villages of the sub-prefecture of Doba and their population in 2014 are:

References

Sub-prefectures of San-Pédro Region
Former communes of Ivory Coast